Kevin Custer Merrell (born December 14, 1995) is an American professional baseball shortstop who is a free agent. He was drafted by the Oakland Athletics in the first round of the 2017 Major League Baseball draft.

Career
Merrell was on the Citrus Park team that advanced to the 2008 Little League World Series. He attended Steinbrenner High School. In 2014, as a senior, he hit .462. He was not drafted in the 2014 MLB draft and he then enrolled at the University of South Florida where he played college baseball. In 2016, he played collegiate summer baseball with the Falmouth Commodores of the Cape Cod Baseball League. In 2017, Merrell's junior year, he slashed .384/.464/.569 with seven home runs and 36 RBIs in 52 games. After the season, he was drafted by the Oakland Athletics in the first round of the 2017 Major League Baseball draft.

Oakland Athletics
Merrell signed with Oakland and was assigned to the Low-A Vermont Lake Monsters where he batted .320 with two home runs, nine RBIs, and a .786 OPS in 31 games. He spent 2018 with the High-A Stockton Ports, with whom he was named a California League All-Star, slashing .267/.308/.326 with 24 RBIs in 62 games. He began 2019 with the Double-A Midland RockHounds.

Kansas City Royals
On July 14, 2019, Merrell was traded to the Kansas City Royals in exchange for Homer Bailey. Following the trade, he was assigned to the Double-A Northwest Arkansas Naturals, with whom he finished the year. Over 124 games between Midland and Northwest Arkansas, Merrell batted .242/.287/.330 with two home runs, 47 RBIs, and 22 stolen bases. Merrell did not play a game in 2020 due to the cancellation of the minor league season because of the COVID-19 pandemic. In 2021, Merrell hit .200/.288/.300 in 54 games between Northwest Arkansas and the Triple-A Omaha Storm Chasers. Merrell was released by the Royals on October 13, 2021.

Minnesota Twins
On January 16, 2022, Merrell signed a minor league contract with the Minnesota Twins organization. Merrell appeared in 44 games split between the Double-A Wichita Wind Surge and the Triple-A St. Paul Saints, hitting .262/.329/.433 with 7 home runs, 19 RBI, and 2 stolen bases. He was released by Minnesota on July 26.

References

External links

Falmouth Commodores players
1995 births
Living people
South Florida Bulls baseball players
Vermont Lake Monsters players
Stockton Ports players
Arizona League Athletics players
Midland RockHounds players
Northwest Arkansas Naturals players
Omaha Storm Chasers players
Wichita Wind Surge players
St. Paul Saints players